HD 114386 b is an exoplanet orbiting the star HD 114386. The planet orbits the star in a rather eccentric orbit. Mean distance from the star is 1.62 AU, somewhat more than distance between Mars and the Sun. At periastron, the planet comes almost as close as Earth orbits the Sun, and at apoastron, the distance is twice as much.

See also
 HD 114783 b

References

External links 
 

Exoplanets discovered in 2004
Giant planets
Centaurus (constellation)
Exoplanets detected by radial velocity